The following is a list of countries by combustion engine exports. Data is from 2018, in billions of United States dollars, as reported by The Observatory of Economic Complexity. Currently, the top ten countries are listed:

References
atlas.media.mit.edu - Observatory of Economic complexity - Countries that export Combustion Engines (2016)

Observatory of Economic complexity - Countries that export Combustion Engines

Engine
engine exports
Engines